Maurice de Berkeley, 2nd Baron Berkeley (April 1271 – 31 May 1326), The Magnanimous, feudal baron of Berkeley, of Berkeley Castle in Gloucestershire, England, was a peer. He rebelled against King Edward II and the Despencers. His epithet, and that of each previous and subsequent head of his family, was coined by John Smyth of Nibley (died 1641), steward of the Berkeley estates, the biographer of the family and author of Lives of the Berkeleys.

Origins
He was born at Berkeley Castle, the eldest son and heir of Thomas de Berkeley, 1st Baron Berkeley (1245–1321), The Wise, feudal baron of Berkeley, by his wife Joan de Ferrers (1255–1309), a daughter of William de Ferrers, 5th Earl of Derby by his wife Margaret de Quincy, a daughter of Roger de Quincy, 2nd Earl of Winchester.

Career
He was involved in the Scottish Wars from about 1295 to 1318. He was Governor of Gloucester 1312, Governor of Berwick-on-Tweed from 1314 which he lost to the Scots under the 1318 Capture of Berwick, Steward of the Duchy of Aquitaine 1319 and Justiciar of South Wales 1316.

He joined the Thomas, 2nd Earl of Lancaster in his rebellion against his first cousin King Edward II and the Despencers. Also on his side in the rebellion was Roger la Zouch of Lubbesthorp, his first wife's nephew, who in January 1326 sanctioned the assassination of Roger de Beler, Baron of the Exchequer.

Marriages and children
He married twice, firstly in 1289 to Eva la Zouche, daughter of Eudo La Zouche by his wife, Millicent de Cantilupe, one of the two daughters and eventual co-heiresses of William III de Cantilupe (died 1254) jure uxoris Lord of Abergavenny, in right of his wife Eva de Braose, heiress of the de Braose dynasty of Welsh Marcher Lords. 

By his wife, he had children including:
Thomas de Berkeley, 3rd Baron Berkeley, born c. 1296
Sir Maurice de Berkeley (1298–1347), of Uley, Gloucester, who in 1337 acquired for his seat the manor of Stoke Gifford in Gloucestershire, and founded there the line of Berkeley of Stoke Gifford. He was killed at the Siege of Calais in 1347. 
Isabel de Berkeley married Robert de Clifford, 3rd Baron de Clifford.
Milicent de Berkeley married John Mautravers/Maltravers (1290-1365), son of John Maultravers (1266 - circa 1343) of Childrey (Berkshire), and Lichet (Dorset).

His second marriage, in about 1316, was to Isabella de Clare, daughter of Gilbert de Clare, 6th Earl of Hertford by his wife Alice de Lusignan.

Death and succession
Berkeley was imprisoned by the Despencers in Wallingford Castle in Berkshire (now in Oxfordshire), where he died on 31 May 1326 and was eventually buried in St Augustine's Abbey (now Bristol Cathedral) in Bristol, founded by his ancestor. He was succeeded by his eldest son Thomas de Berkeley, 3rd Baron Berkeley (born c. 1296).

References
Ancestral roots of certain American colonists who came to America before 1700, Frederick Lewis Weis, 1992, seventh edition.
Ancestral roots of sixty colonists who came to New England 1623–1650.  Frederick Lewis Weis (earlier edition).
Magna Charta Sureties, 1215., Frederick Lewis Weis, Walter Lee Sheppard, Jr., William R. Beall, 1999, 5th Ed.
Magna Charta Sureties, 1215", Frederick Lewis Weis, 4th Ed.
The Complete Peerage, Cokayne.
Burke's Peerage, 1938.
Plantagenet Ancestry of Seventeenth-Century Colonists, David Faris, Genealogical Publishing Co., Inc., 1996.
Royal Genealogy information held at University of Hull.

1271 births
1326 deaths
2
English rebels
People from Berkeley, Gloucestershire
Maurice
Seneschals of Gascony